The women's 100 metre freestyle event at the 11th FINA World Swimming Championships (25m) took place 13 – 14 December 2012 at the Sinan Erdem Dome.

Records
Prior to this competition, the existing world and championship records were as follows.

No new records were set during this competition.

Results

Heats

Semifinals

Rūta Meilutytė of Lithuania withdrew because of too tight schedule.

Final

The final was held at 19:09.

References

External links
 2012 FINA World Swimming Championships (25 m): Women's 100 metre freestyle entry list, from OmegaTiming.com.

Freestyle 0100 metre, women's
World Short Course Swimming Championships
2012 in women's swimming